The 2017 Asian Baseball Cup was an international baseball tournament contested by the men's national teams of WBSC Asia's member associations. It was the 13th edition of the biannual Asian Baseball Cup, and served as qualification to the 2017 Asian Baseball Championship. It was divided into two separate divisions, East and West, alternatively called the 2017 East Asian Baseball Cup and 2017 West Asian Baseball Cup.

The 2017 West Asia Baseball Cup was held from 25 February 2017 to 1 March 2017 at Jinnah Sports Stadium in Islamabad, Pakistan. It  saw Nepal participating in their first competition, and Sri Lanka moving to the West Cup. The latter were crowned as the champions for the first time, after they beat hosts Pakistan in the final.

On the other hand, the 2017 East Asia Baseball Cup was cancelled due to lack of a suitable host.

Participants

East Asia Baseball Cup
East Asia Cup was cancelled due to lack of suitable host.

West Asia Baseball Cup
 (61)
 (54)
 (67)
 (72)
 (24) (host)
 (52)

Pre-tournament WBSC World Rankings (from 24 February 2017) in parentheses

India had to withdraw from the tournament after the team were not issued Pakistan visas.

West Cup 

Group A

NOTE: Tiebreaker notes: HTH − Head-to-head. RS − Runs scored. IPO − Innings the team batted. RA − Runs against. IPD − Innings the team pitched. TQB − The index of (RS/IPO)−(RA/IPD).

Group B

NOTE: Tiebreaker notes: HTH − Head-to-head. RS − Runs scored. IPO − Innings the team batted. RA − Runs against. IPD − Innings the team pitched. TQB − The index of (RS/IPO)−(RA/IPD).

Playoffs

Awards

East Cup

The East Asia Cup was not held in 2017 since no suitable host could be found.

References

2017 in baseball
International baseball competitions hosted by Pakistan
Asian Baseball Cup
2017 in Pakistani sport
February 2017 sports events in Pakistan
Sports competitions in Islamabad